The district of Adur, one of seven local government districts in the English county of West Sussex, has 26 extant churches and other places of worship, and a further five former churches that are no longer in religious use. The southern part of the district forms part of the Brighton/Worthing/Littlehampton conurbation, and almost all of the churches are in the towns and villages within this continuous built-up area. The rural northern part of the district has one ancient church that is still in use, and another former chapel that served a now deserted medieval village. Many Christian denominations are represented, but followers of other religions must travel outside the area to worship.

Seven of Adur's extant places of worship, and two former churches, have been awarded listed status. A building is defined as "listed" when it is placed on a statutory register of buildings of "special architectural or historic interest" in accordance with the Planning (Listed Buildings and Conservation Areas) Act 1990. The Department for Culture, Media and Sport, a Government department, is responsible for this; English Heritage, a non-departmental public body, acts as an agency of the department to administer the process and advise the department on relevant issues. There are three grades of listing status. Grade I, the highest, is defined as being of "exceptional interest"; Grade II* is used for "particularly important buildings of more than special interest"; and Grade II, the lowest, is used for buildings of "special interest".

By the 11th century, the area now covered by Adur district had several small settlements, each with their own church. Although some have been restored and altered, most ancient structural work and internal features remain. These include an anchorite's cell (where a hermit was walled up for life), a rare series of wall paintings, an example of the Tapsel gate design found only in Sussex, and a "Rhenish helm" four-gabled tower cap that is unique in England.

Location

The city of Brighton and Hove lies to the east, and Worthing is to the west. The River Adur, from which the district takes its name, flows from north to south and cuts the area in two. In the Saxon and Norman eras, villages developed on both sides: Southwick, Kingston Buci and Shoreham in the east; Lancing and Sompting in the west. Each had its own ancient church. As the settlements grew, they merged into a continuous urban area and absorbed hamlets such as Upper Cokeham, Lower Cokeham and Fishersgate. Housing spread on to the lower slopes of the Downs, but little extended north of the Old Shoreham Road (built as the main east-west route through the area in the 18th century). The A27 trunk road now forms the northern limit of the urban area.

Churches had been founded at Southwick, Kingston Buci, Old Shoreham, Sompting, the downland village of Coombes and the now abandoned village of Old Erringham at the time of the Domesday Survey in 1086. New Shoreham's church existed by the end of the 11th century, and Lancing had one by the 12th century.

Religious affiliation
According to the 2011 United Kingdom census, 61,182 people lived in Adur. Of these, 58.6% identified themselves as Christian, 1% were Muslim, 0.4% were Jewish, 0.3% were Buddhist, 0.2% were Hindu, fewer than 0.1% were Sikh, 0.6% followed another religion, 31.3% claimed no religious affiliation and 7.6% did not state their religion.  The proportion of Christians was lower than the 59.4% in England as a whole, while affiliation with Islam, Hinduism and Sikhism was much less widespread than in England overall: in 2011, 5% of people in England were Muslim, 1.5% were Hindu and 0.8% were Sikh. The proportion of Jews was slightly lower than the national figure of 0.5%, and the proportion of people with no religious affiliation was higher than the 24.7% recorded nationally.

Administration
Adur's 11 extant Church of England churches are in the Archdeaconry of Chichester, one of four archdeaconries in the Diocese of Chichester, whose cathedral is at Chichester. The churches at Coombes, Lancing (St James the Less at North Lancing and St Michael and All Angels at South Lancing) and Sompting (St Mary the Blessed Virgin and St Peter the Apostle) are part of the Worthing Deanery of the Archdeaconry of Chichester. The three churches at Shoreham-by-Sea, two in Kingston Buci and St Michael and All Angels Church at Southwick are part of Hove Deanery within the Brighton & Lewes Archdeaconry. The redundant church at Fishersgate was also within this deanery.

The Roman Catholic Diocese of Arundel and Brighton, whose cathedral is at Arundel, administers Adur's Roman Catholic churches. The parish of Our Lady Queen of Peace, Adur Valley, includes St Peter's Church in Shoreham-by-Sea as well as churches in Steyning and Upper Beeding in the adjacent district of Horsham.  St Theresa of Lisieux Church in Southwick is in the combined parish of Southwick with Portslade and West Blatchington, which also serves the Portslade, Hangleton and West Blatchington areas of Brighton and Hove. The Church of the Holy Family in Lancing is part of the parish of East Worthing in the neighbouring district of Worthing.

Southwick Christian Community Church is part of the 28-church South-East Area of the Congregational Federation, an association of independent Congregational churches in Great Britain. The federation came into existence in 1972 when the Congregational Church in England and Wales merged with several other denominations to form the United Reformed Church. Certain congregations wanted to remain independent of this, and instead joined the Congregational Federation. As of January 2021 there were 235 churches in the Federation.  The church has its origins in a fellowship founded by Shoreham Baptist Church, and both churches are also members of the organisation Baptists Together (the Baptist Union of Great Britain).  Shoreham Baptist Church is also a member of the Evangelical Alliance.  Lancing Tabernacle belongs to the Fellowship of Independent Evangelical Churches.

The three Methodist churches in Adur, at Lancing, Shoreham-by-Sea and Southwick, are part of the 15-church West Sussex (Coast and Downs) Methodist Circuit.

Current places of worship

Former places of worship

See also
Grade I listed buildings in West Sussex
Listed buildings in Adur
List of demolished places of worship in West Sussex

Notes

References

Bibliography

Adur
Adur
Adur District